The Green Line is a development corridor in Downtown Atlanta stretching from Georgia International Plaza in the west, including The Gulch, and following the rail corridor east alongside Underground Atlanta and terminating at Jesse Hill, Jr. Drive SE (one block southeast of Piedmont Ave.) The Gulch would be covered with parking and transit underneath and open space on top.

External links
 Green Line Full Report, prepared by Bleakly Advisory Group, Inc., Economic Development Research Group, Inc., and Kimley-Horn Associates, Inc.for Central Atlanta Progress and Atlanta Downtown Improvement District
 Economic Impact Analysis of the Downtown Green Line Vision Plan and Georgia Multi-modal Passenger Terminal, prepared by Hellmuth, Obata & Kassabaum, Inc. for Central Atlanta Progress and Atlanta Downtown Improvement District, January 2012

References

Atlanta
Neighborhoods in Atlanta